Alured (or Alfred) was a medieval Bishop of Worcester.

Life

Alured was a clerk of King Henry, probably Henry II of England. He was consecrated about 13 April 1158. He died on 31 July 1160.

Citations

References
 British History Online Bishops of Worcester accessed on 3 November 2007
 

Bishops of Worcester
1160 deaths
12th-century English Roman Catholic bishops
Year of birth unknown